Conasprella articulata, common name the Nada cone, is a species of sea snail, a marine gastropod mollusk in the family Conidae, the cone snails and their allies.

Like all species within the genus Conasprella, these snails are predatory and venomous. They are capable of "stinging" humans, therefore live ones should be handled carefully or not at all.

Description
The size of the shell varies between 15 mm and 29 mm. The shell is chestnut-colored, with revolving lines articulated with chocolate and white, a central white band and another below the angle of the spire.

Distribution
This species occurs in the Indian Ocean off East Africa and off the Mascarene Basin; also off Indo-China, Indo-Malaysia, New Caledonia and off Queensland, Australia.

References

 Sowerby, G.B. (3rd) 1873. Descriptions of five new Cones. Proceedings of the Zoological Society of London 1873: 145–146, pl. 15, figs. 1–5 
 Sowerby, G.B. (3rd) 1881. Description of eight new species of shells. Proceedings of the Zoological Society of London 1881: 635–639
 Azuma, M. & Toki, R. 1970. Description of a new cone shell from Kii Peninsula, Honshu. Venus 29(3): 77–80
 Shikama, T. 1970. On some noteworthy marine Gastropoda from southwestern Japan (II). Science Reports of the Yokohama National University 16: 19–27, 1 pl.
 Drivas, J.; Jay, M. (1987). Coquillages de La Réunion et de l'Île Maurice. Collection Les Beautés de la Nature. Delachaux et Niestlé: Neuchâtel. . 159 pp. 
 Röckel, D., Korn, W. & Kohn, A.J. 1995. Manual of the Living Conidae. Volume 1: Indo-Pacific Region. Wiesbaden : Hemmen 517 pp. 
 Tucker J.K. & Tenorio M.J. (2009) Systematic classification of Recent and fossil conoidean gastropods. Hackenheim: Conchbooks. 296 pp.
  Puillandre N., Duda T.F., Meyer C., Olivera B.M. & Bouchet P. (2015). One, four or 100 genera? A new classification of the cone snails. Journal of Molluscan Studies. 81: 1–23

External links
 The Conus Biodiversity website
 Cone Shells – Knights of the Sea
 

articulata
Gastropods described in 1873